Yassir Abdul-Mohsen (born May 27, 1988, in Baghdad, Iraq), is an Iraqi footballer who plays as a right winger for Al-Naft in Iraqi Premier League.

International debut
On December 3, 2012, Yassir made his full international debut against Bahrain in a friendly match, which the match was ended 0-0.

References

External links
Profile on Goalzz

1988 births
Living people
Association football midfielders
Al-Talaba SC players
Sportspeople from Baghdad
Iraqi footballers
Iraq international footballers